Melissodes bimaculatus, the two-spotted longhorn, is a species of long-horned bee in the family Apidae.

Subspecies
These two subspecies belong to the species Melissodes bimaculatus:
 Melissodes bimaculatus bimaculatus (Lepeletier, 1825)
 Melissodes bimaculatus nullus LaBerge, 1956

References

Further reading

 
 

Apinae
Insects described in 1825